Achrestogrammus is an extinct genus of prehistoric Scorpaeniformes fish that lived during the Upper Miocene subepoch.

See also

 Prehistoric fish
 List of prehistoric bony fish

References

Miocene fish
Scorpaeniformes genera
Prehistoric ray-finned fish genera
Hexagrammidae